Eviron is a small rural locality approximately  south-west of Tweed Heads in the Tweed Shire, part of the Northern Rivers region of New South Wales, Australia.

References

Northern Rivers
Tweed Shire
Towns in New South Wales